The Godmakers (1972) is a science fiction novel by Frank Herbert. The title of early editions was sometimes styled The God Makers.

Summary
It explores the concepts of war and peace, good government and religious belief.  It can be seen as a bridging novel between the ConSentiency universe series and human-centric Dune universe.

It is a novel expanded from four short stories:

 "You Take the High Road". Appeared in Astounding Science Fiction, May 1958
 "Missing link". Appeared in Astounding Science Fiction February 1959
 "Operation Haystack". Appeared in Astounding Science Fiction, May 1959
 "The Priests of Psi". Appeared in Fantastic Science Fiction Stories, February 1960

The story focuses on Lewis Orne, an agent for a government agency which develops 'lost planets.' After correctly identifying a warlike civilization on the planet Hamal, he is drafted into Investigative Adjustment (I-A), which manages dangerous planets. Under the auspices of I-A, he travels to various planets in order to maintain peace throughout the galaxy. At the same time, the priests of the planet Amel, who practice 'religious engineering', set about creating a god, something they have done numerous times before: We do not know from what creature or thing the god will be born', the Abbod said. 'It could be one of you. After resolving a number of dangerous situations, Lewis is injured and has a near-death experience. Following this, his psychic powers develop, and after passing a series of tests he becomes a god.

Reception
Colin Greenland reviewed The Godmakers for Imagine magazine, and stated that "For all his ever-expanding cosmic perspective, Herbert still writes characters who look and sound as if they'd been cut off the backs of cornflake packets."

References

1972 American novels
American science fiction novels
G. P. Putnam's Sons books
Novels by Frank Herbert
Religion in science fiction